T. L. Burton (Thomas Lingen (Tom) Burton; born 1944) is an emeritus professor at the University of Adelaide and a reputed scholar of medieval English literature, language, and dialectics. He is the editor of the two volume Sidrak and Bokkus, which once was one of the most popular books in Middle English. In addition to numerous publications on Middle English, Burton has also written books for a more general audience. He is a founding director of the Chaucer Studio, a non-profit organization which produces recordings in period pronunciation of Middle English texts and makes these available as instructional aids. 
Burton's current research interest is in the poetry of William Barnes. He has written several articles on this subject, and regularly organises performances of Barnes' poetry in the poet's original Dorset dialect for the Adelaide Fringe Festival.

Burton has won several major prizes for his teaching.

Publications

Editing
Burton, Tom. 'Mistranslation or Adaptation in Medieval Manuscripts: Can One Tell the Difference?' Lingua Humanitatis 2.2 (Oct. 2002): 129-41.
Burton, Tom. Sidrak and Bokkus: A Parallel-Text Edition from Bodleian Library, MS Laud Misc. 559 and British Library, MS Lansdowne 793. 2 Vols, Early English Text Society, Original Series 311 and 312. Oxford: Oxford UP, 1998–99.
Burton, Tom. ‘Proverbs, Sentences, and Proverbial Phrases from the English Sidrak'. Mediaeval Studies 51 (1989): 329–54.
Burton, Tom. ‘The Crocodile as the Symbol of an Evil Woman: A Medieval Interpretation of the Crocodile–Trochilus Relationship'. Parergon 20 (1978): 25–33.
Burton, Tom. ‘Late Fifteenth-Century "Terms of Association" in MS Pepys 1047'. Notes and Queries 223 (1978): 7–12.
Burton, Tom. ‘Sidrak on Reproduction and Sexual Love'. Medical History 19 (1975): 286–302.

Middle English dialectology
Burton, Tom. 'On the Current State of Middle English Dialectology'. Leeds Studies in English NS 22 (1991): 167–208. [Discussing A Linguistic Atlas of Late Mediaeval English, by Angus McIntosh, M.L. Samuels, and Michael Benskin (Aberdeen UP, 1986).]

William Barnes
Burton, Tom. William Barnes's Dialect Poems: A Pronunciation Guide. The Chaucer Studio Press. 2010.
Burton, Tom. The Sound of William Barnes's Dialect Poems. University of Adelaide Press. 2013.
Burton, Tom and K. K. Ruthven. The Complete Poems of William Barnes: Volume 1. Oxford University Press. 2013.

General
Burton, Tom. Words, Words, Words. University Radio 5UV, 1995
Burton, Tom. Words in Your Ear. Wakefield Press, 1999, 
Burton, Tom. Long Words Bother Me. Sutton Publishing, 2004. This is the UK republication, in one volume, for the two above-cited works.

External links
Burton's faculty homepage at the University of Adelaide

1944 births
Living people
University of Adelaide alumni
Academic staff of the University of Adelaide